Muzyka Klasyczna is the first collaborative album by Polish rapper Pezet, a member of Płomień 81; and Polish producer Noon, a member of Grammatik.

Track list

Polish-language albums
2002 albums